Bubblin' may refer to:

 "Bubblin" (Anderson Paak song), 2018
 "Bubblin'" (Blue song), 2004
 "Bubblin'" (Cru song), 1997
 "Bubblin'", a song by Boris from the album Live My Life, 2009

See also 
 "Bubblin, Bubblin (Piña Colada)" a song by Rahzel on Make the Music 2000
 "Bubbling Over", a song by Percy Faith
 Bubbling Brown Sugar, musical
 Bubble (disambiguation)